Stefano Lusignan (1537–1590), also known as Étienne de Lusignan and Estienne de Lusignan, was a priest, scholar, and titular bishop of Venetian Cyprus who migrated to Italy and France.

Life
Lusignan was born in Nicosia, in Venetian Cyprus, a descendant of the royal House of Lusignan. When he was young, Lusignan joined the Dominican Order and studied under an Armenian bishop named Ioulianos. By 1562 he was a priest and worked under two Latin bishops of Limassol, Andrea Mocenigo and Serafim Fortibraccia. By 1570, he was living in a monastery in Naples, in the Kingdom of Naples, where he began writing his best-known work, Chorograffia. In 1571, Cyprus fell to the Ottoman Empire, and after that Lusignan spent much of his time collecting ransom money to buy the freedom of relations who had been captured. In 1572, he moved to a monastery at Bologna, a university city in the Papal States. There, he first published his work named Chorograffia. In 1575 he moved to Padua, under the control of the Republic of Venice, and there he designed a famous map to supplement his book, dedicating it to the last Latin Archbishop of Cyprus, Filippo Mocenigo. The map was engraved by Giovanni Longo and paid for by Lusignan himself. His Chorograffia and his Description de toute l'isle de Cypre include many classical sources such as Strabo, Pliny, Virgil, Ovid, Pausanias, Plutarch, Diogenes Laertius and reference various ancient cities like Salamis, Kourion and Amathus and important mythological figures of Cyprus such as Cinyras, Aphrodite and Adonis. In the course of his stay in Padua, Lusignan also taught Greek at the University of Padua. During a trip to Rome, he met the French ambassador and with his help moved to Paris in 1577. He lived in a monastery in Paris for ten years. Throughout his stay there he wrote and published many works. He was also involved in literary circles with other Cypriots, including Enrico Caterino Davila. In 1578 Pope Sixtus V appointed Lusignan as Titular Bishop of Limassol. He spent the last years of his life in Rome, where he died in 1590.

Publications 
 Chorograffia: et breve historia universale dell'Isola de Cipro principiando al tempo di Noè per in sino al 1572 (Bologna: Alessandro Benaccio, 1573)
Histoire Contenant une Sommaire Description des Genealogies, Alliances, & gestes de tous les Princes & grans Seigneurs... Royames Hierusalem, Cypre, Armenie, & lieux circonvoisins. (Paris: Chez Guillaume Chaudiere, 1579)
Description de Toute l'Isle de Cypre, et des Roys, Princes, et Seigneurs, tant Payens que Chrestiens, qui ont commandé en icelle (Paris: Chez Guillaume Chaudiere, 1580)

Digitised manuscripts of the Chronograffia 

 Getty Research Institute has two copies
 The John Adams Library at the Boston Public Library
 Sylvia Ioannou Foundation

See also 

 Leontios Machairas
 Georgios Boustronios
 Florio Bustron
 Venetian Cyprus

References 
 Kitromilides, P., Κυπριακή Λογιοσύνη: 1571-1878 (Nicosia, 2002)

1537 births
1590 deaths
16th-century Italian Roman Catholic priests
Academic staff of the University of Padua
Cypriot emigrants to Italy
People from Nicosia
Cypriot historians
Cypriot non-fiction writers